The South Dakota State Library (SDSL) Is the official State Library of South Dakota located in Pierre, South Dakota. The SDSL is a division of the Department of Education and is governed by the seven-member South Dakota State Library Board. SDSL manages the Braille and Talking Book Library (est. 1968), provides a wide variety of online research and educational resources, and provide reference and research for state agencies. They are one of the smallest state libraries in the United States.

History
A state library was originally created in 1901 by the South Dakota Legislature which established the State Historical Society and the Department of History of the State of South Dakota. The Department of History oversaw state library until 1913, when the Free Library Commission took over governance of the institution that became the South Dakota State Library.

Building
SDSL was first housed in the office of the Department of History in the State Capitol in the early 1900s. It moved in to its own space in that building in 1932. In 1957 it had outgrown that space and moved into a grocery warehouse. Since 1976, the library has been in the MacKay Building in Pierre—which was purpose-built to house the SDSL—first on the lower two floors and now on the first floor.

State librarians

References

External links

State libraries of the United States